is a Japanese photographer.

Morinaga worked as an assistant to W. Eugene Smith.

Work by Morinaga is held in the permanent collection of the Tokyo Metropolitan Museum of Photography.

References

Japanese photographers
1937 births
2018 deaths